= Chang Darreh =

Kangarloo کنگرلی Kangarlee (with indigenous people's accent)
- Location in Iran
- Coordinates: 38°35′14″N 47°47′19″E
- Country: Iran
- Province: Ardabil Province
- Time zone: UTC+3:30 (IRST)
  - Summer (DST): UTC+4:30 (IRDT)

Chang Darreh is a village in the Ardabil Province of Iran.
